Sechü-Zubza is a town in the Kohima District of the Indian state of Nagaland. It is located 17 km north-west of Kohima, the capital of Nagaland.

References

Villages in Kohima district